is the seventh studio album from contemporary Christian music duo Tercer Cielo. The album was released digitally on April 5, 2011 and then on May 3 in physical format. The album was produced and distributed under the Universal Music Latin/Vene Music/Fé y Obra Music/Kasa Productions/Mucho Fruto record labels. The album's lead single, "Tu amor no es de este mundo", was a hit in Latin America and North America. The music video reached over 10 million views on YouTube. The album was produced and written solely by Tercer Cielo member Juan Carlos Rodríguez. To promote the album, Tercer Cielo embarked on an international tour in the Americas and Europe. The album won a Latin Grammy in 2011.

Antecedents and production
After promoting his previous album, Gente común, sueños extraordinarios, and having recorded his first live album in the Coliseo of Puerto Rico, Rodríguez began to devote time to the production of a new album. At the end of 2009, Juan Carlos announced via his Twitter account that the duo's album was in the pre-production stage and the title already was chosen. In early 2011, the duo posted a video on YouTube of them working in the recording studio and previewed songs which would be on the album, such as the unreleased track "Estaré" which consists of electronic music and dancepop, marking the duo's first steps into both musical genres. The recording process lasted for two months in both Bryan Studio in the Dominican Republic and Fé Studio in Chandler, Arizona, United States.

Attainments

The album reached number 2 spot of the most sold albums in Puerto Rico, according to Nielsen's SoundScan index.

Single

"Tu amor no es de este mundo"
In August 2011, the first single of the album "Tu amor no es de este mundo", a song written and produced by Juan Carlos Rodríguez with acoustic rhythms and Latin pop, was released.  The official music video for the song was released on 17 August 2011. The single charted at number 25 on Latin Pop Airplay of Billboard.

Track listing

Charts

Awards and nominations

Credits and personnel
 Juan Carlos Rodríguez: Composer, mix, producer, recording, voice
 Evelyn Herrera: voice
 Apolinar: trombonist
 Richard Bravo: drummer
 José Fléte: trombonist
 Rebecca Jefferson: changing room
 Axel Rivera: battery

References

2011 albums
Tercer Cielo albums